Jucker  may refer to:

 Jucker (surname)
 Jucker Farm, a Swiss agrotourism company
 Berli Jucker, a Thai import and export firm based in Bangkok 
 Jucker (card game), an Alsatian card game and purported ancestor of Euchre